The 1995 North Rhine-Westphalia state election was held on 14 May 1995 to elect the 12th Landtag of North Rhine-Westphalia. The outgoing government was a majority of the Social Democratic Party (SPD), led by Minister-President Johannes Rau.

The SPD remained the largest party but lost its majority for the first time since 1980, declining to 46%. The opposition Christian Democratic Union (CDU) made small gains and took 37.7% of the vote. The Greens achieved a significant victory, doubling their vote share to 10% and winning 24 seats. Since the Free Democratic Party (FDP) fell below the 5% electoral threshold and lost representation, the Greens alone held the balance of power. They subsequently formed a coalition with the SPD.

Electoral system
The Landtag was elected via mixed-member proportional representation. 151 members were elected in single-member constituencies via first-past-the-post voting, and fifty then allocated using compensatory proportional representation. A single ballot was used for both. The minimum size of the Landtag was 201 members, but if overhang seats were present, proportional leveling seats were added to ensure proportionality. An electoral threshold of 5% of valid votes is applied to the Landtag; parties that fall below this threshold are ineligible to receive seats.

Background

In the previous election held on 13 May 1990, the SPD retained a reduced majority with just under 50% of the vote. The CDU failed to recoup their losses from the previous election and took 37%, while the FDP remained steady on 6% and the Greens narrowly surpassed 5% and won seats for the first time. The SPD won 121 of the 151 constituencies, necessitating the addition of leveling seats which boosted the Landtag to a record size of 237 members (later 239 after an election review). The SPD once again formed government alone and Johannes Rau continued as Minister-President.

Parties
The table below lists parties represented in the 11th Landtag of North Rhine-Westphalia.

Campaign
The election followed the October 1994 federal election and March 1995 Hessian state election, both of which had seen victories for the incumbent government and significant gains for the Greens. In Hesse, the SPD suffered its worst result since 1946.

The CDU held a membership ballot to select their lead candidate. With 59.6% of votes, Landtag faction leader Helmut Linssen prevailed against MdB and state secretary Norbert Lammert.

Beside the influence of federal politics, where popular support for the Kohl government was declining due to growing economic difficulties, environmental issues dominated the campaign. Garzweiler II, a proposed lignite-mining project, was particularly contentious: the project, which would have involved forced resettlement of local residents, was generally supported by the SPD and firmly rejected by the Greens. The CDU opposition focused on topics such as education, domestic security and crime, and support for local industries, though their positions were not markedly different from those of the SPD. As such, most controversy during the campaign was between the SPD and the Greens.

Results

External links

References

Elections in North Rhine-Westphalia